Jagan in Iran may refer to:
 Jagan, Jiroft, Kerman Province
 Jagan, Qaleh Ganj, Kerman Province
 Jagan, West Azerbaijan
 Jagan-e Kord, West Azerbaijan Province